At the 1936 Summer Olympics in Berlin, nine events in gymnastics were contested. The competitions were held from 10 August 1936 to 12 August 1936.

Medal table

Men's events

Women's events

†  Within the sport of artistic gymnastics, although men were recognized with individual medals at the time, the women weren’t.  The individuals named within individual events are the individuals who garnered a top-three placement in the team competition on the respective apparatus (or all 3 combined, in the case of the all-around) and who would have been awarded a medal with the rules that commenced with the 1952 Helsinki Summer Olympic Games and that would change periodically at future Olympic Games with respect to the debut of:  1)  the individual finals competitions at the 1972 Munich Summer Olympics and 2) the New Life rules that made their Olympic debut at the 1992 Barcelona Summer Olympics.

††  At this Olympics, some women competed on the Uneven Bars while some others competed on Parallel Bars.

References

External links

 
1936
1936 Summer Olympics events
1936 in gymnastics